The Priory School is a  co-educational secondary school and sixth form located in Hitchin in the English county of Hertfordshire.

The Priory School is the only co-educational secondary school in Hitchin, the others being Hitchin Boys' School and Hitchin Girls' School. The Priory School is part of the Hitchin Consortium with Hitchin Boys’ School and Hitchin Girls’ School for Sixth Form.

History

Hitchin High School for Girls was opened in 1954 by Her Majesty, Queen Elizabeth, The Queen Mother, and later in 1974 became Bowes Lyon and became co-educational after 1975.

In 1988 it became a comprehensive school and renamed The Priory School after the amalgamation of Bowes Lyon and Hitchin School (Bessemer), but has since gained specialisms in Computing, Business and Enterprise. Previously a community school wholly operated by Hertfordshire County Council, in 2016 The Priory School converted to foundation school status. As a foundation school the governing body and senior leadership team have taken on extra responsibilities from Hertfordshire County Council in operating the school.

Former Headteacher of the school, Peter Loach, retired at the end of the 2013 Summer term. He was succeeded by Geraint Edwards, previously the acting head of Marriotts School in Stevenage.

The Priory School is a member of the Stonewall scheme, and in 2017 was visited by actor Ian McKellen, who gave a talk about LGBTQ+ rights. The school has a resident counsellor and sixteen staff members have been trained in mental health first aid.

Facilities
The Priory School has a 25-foot climbing wall with a traverse section, a sports hall, gymnasium, floodlit Multi-Use Games Area and dance studio.

Notable former pupils
Jack Wilshere, A.G.F and England football player.
Molly-Mae Hague, Reality Star.

References

External links
The Priory School official website

Secondary schools in Hertfordshire
Educational institutions established in 1988
1988 establishments in England
Buildings and structures in Hitchin
Foundation schools in Hertfordshire